Sir William Alexander Smith (27 October 1854 – 10 May 1914), the founder of the Boys' Brigade, was born in Pennyland House, Thurso, Scotland. He was the eldest son of Major David Smith and his wife Harriet. He had one sister and two brothers.

Education 
Smith was educated at the Miller Institution, known as the "Thurso Academy". There is now a building at Boys' Brigade Headquarters in Hemel Hempstead called the Thurso Centre.

Following his father's death, his family moved to Glasgow. In early January 1869, he became a pupil in a private school, The Western Educational Institution, more widely known as "Burns' and Sutherland’s School". In his first and only term there, he took seven prizes. His time in the institution was short-lived as he ended his school days late in May, aged 14.

Nonetheless, Smith did not cease his education altogether. His writings in a notebook indicated that he continued to take French classes after joining his uncle's business.

Late adolescence and adulthood 
In October 1869, a few days before his 15th birthday, be began working in his uncle's business. Alex. Fraser & Co. were wholesale dealers in "soft goods", shawls being one of their chief markets.

He later joined the 1st Lanarkshire Rifle Volunteers, part of the local Volunteer Force, and at the age of 19, he was promoted to the rank Lance-Corporal. He also joined the Church of Scotland in that same year.

Smith was commissioned into the Rifle Volunteers in 1877 and promoted to Lieutenant later the same year. He also became a Sunday School teacher. It was a combination of these two activities that led him to found the Boys' Brigade on 4 October 1883 at Free Church Mission Hall, North Woodside Road, Glasgow. In 1909 he was knighted by King Edward VII for his services to children. He reached the rank of Honorary Colonel in the Lanarkshire Rifle Volunteers.

He died on 10 May 1914 in London. He was buried in Glasgow Western Necropolis. There is a memorial stone in honour of him in St Paul's Cathedral, London, and in St Giles' Cathedral, Edinburgh. There is also a Memorial Plaque in Glasgow Cathedral, it is at the Northwest corner of the Nave.

References

External links
 The Development of Muscular Christianity in Victorian Britain and Beyond
 Memorial stone at Saint Giles Cathedral, Edinburgh

1854 births
1914 deaths
Cameronians officers
Scottish Presbyterians
Boys' Brigade
People from Thurso
Knights Bachelor